Trute  is a village in the administrative district of Gmina Nowy Targ, within Nowy Targ County, Lesser Poland Voivodeship, in southern Poland.

The village has a population of 560. Trute {true-teeh} runs parallel to the river "Lepietnica", the main street diverts in two directions creating a letter T shape. The village has a small forest "Grel" that stretches along the boundaries.

References

Trute